George Snell may refer to:
George Snell (priest) (died 1701), Anglican archdeacon
George Dixon Snell (1836–1911), mayor of Spanish Fork, Utah
George Davis Snell (1903–1996), American geneticist
George Snell (bishop) (1907–2006), Bishop in the Anglican Church of Canada